Country music singer Willie Nelson, besides a varied musical career, has appeared in many films since his debut in The Electric Horseman (1979). His highlights include Barbarosa, Honeysuckle Rose and the film version of his album Red Headed Stranger.

References

Filmography
Nelson, Willie
Nelson, Willie